Adrian Staszewski (born 31 May 1990) is a Polish volleyball player, a two–time Champions League winner (2021, 2022). At the professional club level, he plays for ZAKSA Kędzierzyn-Koźle.

Honours

Clubs
 CEV Champions League
  2020/2021 – with ZAKSA Kędzierzyn-Koźle
  2021/2022 – with ZAKSA Kędzierzyn-Koźle

 National championships
 2015/2016  Belgian SuperCup, with Lindemans Aalst
 2020/2021  Polish SuperCup, with ZAKSA Kędzierzyn-Koźle
 2020/2021  Polish Cup, with ZAKSA Kędzierzyn-Koźle
 2021/2022  Polish Cup, with ZAKSA Kędzierzyn-Koźle
 2021/2022  Polish Championship, with ZAKSA Kędzierzyn-Koźle
 2022/2023  Polish Cup, with ZAKSA Kędzierzyn-Koźle

References

External links
 
 Player profile at PlusLiga.pl 
 Player profile at Volleybox.net

1990 births
Living people
Sportspeople from Kielce
Polish men's volleyball players
Polish expatriate sportspeople in Belgium
Expatriate volleyball players in Belgium
Effector Kielce players
ZAKSA Kędzierzyn-Koźle players
Outside hitters